This is a List of major honours won by football clubs in Romania. It lists all the Romanian football clubs who have won a domestic or European Trophy. Steaua București is the most decorated side in Romanian football, holding the record number of wins in every single internal competition, and being the only Romanian club to have obtained continental honours.

Note: This list does not include the UEFA Intertoto Cup which was won by Oţelul Galaţi (2007) and Vaslui (2008) as they are not classified as outright winners by UEFA having failed to have the best run in the UEFA Cup out of the teams that had won the competition in those respective seasons.

Honours table

Teams in Italics no longer exist. 
Teams in Bold compete in the 2022–23 Liga I season.

This table is updated as of 19th of May 2022, following Sepsi Sfântu Gheorghe winning the 2021–22 Cupa României.

See also 
List of Romanian football champions
Football records in Romania

References

External links
Rec.Sport.Soccer Statistics Foundation

honors